The 1912 Toronto Argonauts season was the 29th season for the team since the franchise's inception in 1873. The team finished in first place in the Interprovincial Rugby Football Union with a 5–1 record and qualified for the playoffs. After defeating the Toronto Varsity Blues in the Eastern Final, the Argonauts lost the 4th Grey Cup to the Hamilton Alerts.

Regular season

Standings

Schedule

Postseason

Grey Cup

November 30 @ A.A.A. Grounds (Attendance: 5,337)

References

Toronto Argonauts seasons